The FIS Nordic World Ski Championships 1999 took place February 19–28, 1999 in Ramsau am Dachstein, Austria. The large hill ski jumping events took place at the Paul-Ausserleitner-Schanze in Bischofshofen. The 7.5 km Nordic combined sprint event debuted at these championships.

Men's cross-country skiing

10 km classical 
February 22, 1999

10 km + 15 km combined pursuit 
February 23, 1999

30 km freestyle 
February 19, 1999

50 km classical 
February 28, 1999

4 × 10 km relay
February 26, 1999

The first two legs were run in the classical style while the last two legs were run in freestyle. Austria won its first relay medal since 1933 though it was done in dramatic fashion. Botvinov fell during his leg, causing Austria to lose its large lead, setting up a fight to the finish between Austria's Hoffmann and Norway's Alsgaard. As of 2021, this is the last men's relay at the world championships that was not won by Norway.

Women's cross-country skiing

5 km classical 
February 22, 1999

5 km + 10 km combined pursuit 
February 23, 1999

Taranenko became the first Ukrainian to medal in the FIS Nordic World Ski Championships.

15 km freestyle 
February 19, 1999

30 km classical 
February 27, 1999

4 × 5 km relay
February 26, 1999

The first two legs were run in classical style while the last two legs were run in freestyle.

Men's Nordic combined

7.5 km sprint
February 27, 1999

15 km Individual Gundersen
February 20, 1999

4 × 5 km team
February 25, 1999

Men's ski jumping

Individual normal hill 

February 26, 1999 at the W90-Mattensprunganlage

Individual large hill 
February 21, 1999 at the Paul-Ausserleitner-Schanze in Bischofshofen, Austria.

Team large hill
February 20, 1999 at the Paul-Ausserleitner-Schanze in Bischofshofen, Austria.

Medal table
Medal winners by nation.

References

FIS 1999 Cross country results
FIS 1999 Nordic combined results
FIS 1999 Ski jumping results

FIS Nordic World Ski Championships
1999 in Austrian sport
1999 in Nordic combined
February 1999 sports events in Europe
Nordic skiing competitions in Austria